Jean-Jacques Dussumier (1792–1883) was a French voyager and merchant from Bordeaux. He is known as a collector of zoological species from southern Asia and regions around the Indian Ocean between 1816 and 1840. These collections were later studied and classified by French zoologists such as Georges Cuvier, Achille Valenciennes, among others.

Taxa named in his honor 
Dussumier's name was lent to numerous species, and an entire genus of herrings is called Dussumieria. The following is a list of zoological species associated with Dussumier:

Acanthurus dussumieri – Dussumier's surgeonfish; aka Dussumieri tang
Accipiter badius dussumieri – subspecies of Indian shikra
Ambassis dussumieri G. Cuvier, 1828;  the Malabar glassy perchlet.
Anisakis dussumieri – a marine parasite
Arius dussumieri – blacktip sea catfish
Aspidontus dussumieri (Valenciennes, 1836) – lance blenny
Austrobatrachus dussumieri – flat toadfish
Boleophthalmus dussumieri Valenciennes, 1837 – a species of mudskipper in India
Brama dussumieri – lesser bream
Caligus dussumieri – a marine parasite
Carcharhinus dussumieri – whitecheek shark
Casarea dussumieri (Schlegel, 1837) – Round Island keel-scaled boa
Cinnyris dussumieri – Seychelles sunbird
Clarias dussumieri Valenciennes, 1840 – a species of air-breathing catfish
Coilia dussumieri Valenciennes, 1848 – goldspotted grenadier anchovy
Colletteichthys dussumieri (Valenciennes, 1837) the flat toadfish. 
Dieurostus dussumieri (A.M.C. Duméril, Bibron & A.H.A. Duméril, 1854) – Dussumier's water snake
Dipsochelys dussumieri (synonym of Aldabrachelys gigantea) – Aldabra giant tortoise
Draco dussumieri A.M.C. Duméril & Bibron, 1837 – South Indian flying dragon
Hyporhamphus dussumieri (Valenciennes, 1847) – Dussumier's halfbeak
Istiblennius dussumieri (Valenciennes, 1836) the streaky rockskipper a species of blenny
Johnius dussumieri – Dussumier's croaker
Labeo dussumieri (Valenciennes, 1842) – Malabar Labeo
Leiognathus dussumieri – Dussumier's ponyfish
Liza dussumieri – Dussumier's mullet
Mariaella dussumieri – an Asian species of slug
Mugil dussumieri – a species of gray mullet
Salarias dussumieri – Dussumier's blenny
Salmaciella dussumieri – a species of starfish
Semnopithecus dussumieri – southern plains gray langur
Sphenomorphus dussumieri – Dussumier's forest skink
Tachysurus dussumieri – catfish from the Bay of Bengal
Tetronychoteuthis dussumieri – a small mollusk
Thryssa dussumieri – Dussumier's thryssa; an anchovy
Uca dussumieri – a species of fiddler crab

References

External links
Expeditions and Surveys Jean Jaques Dussumier's independent voyages.

1792 births
1883 deaths
French zoologists
French merchants
19th-century French businesspeople